A blue whale unit (BWU) was a unit of measurement used in the regulation of whaling.  It was originally used by a cartel of whaling companies in the Antarctic Ocean in the 1930s. It was later used by the International Whaling Commission through the 1960s to measure nations respective whale quotas.
One blue whale unit can be expressed in terms of: one blue whale, two fin whales, two and a half humpback whale, or six sei whales. The ratios are roughly based on the relative amounts of oil that each species yields.

References 

Whaling